The 2020–21 Ligue Haïtienne season is the 58th season of top-tier football in Haiti. It began on 5 September 2020 and ended in July 2021. The league Championnat National Haïtien Professionnel is split into two tournaments—the Série d'Ouverture and the Série de Clôture—each with identical formats and each contested by the same 18 teams.

Teams
 America des Cayes
 Arcahaie FC
 AS Capoise
 AS Cavaly
 AS Mirebalais
 Baltimore SC
 Cosmopolites SC
 Don Bosco FC
 FC Juventus des Cayes
 FICA
 Ouanaminthe FC
 Racing Club Haïtien
 Racing Gônaïves FC
 Real Hope FA
 Tempête FC
 Triomphe Liancourt FC
 US Rivartibonitienne
 Violette AC

Série d'Ouverture

Regular season

Standings

Playoffs

Quarterfinals 
The matches were played on December 23 and 27, 2020.

Semifinals
The matches were played on December 30, 2020, and January 3, 2021.

Finals
The matches were played on January 6 and 10, 2021.

Série de Clôture

Regular season

Standings

Playoffs

Quarterfinals

Semifinals

Finals

Aggregate table

References

External links
RSSSF

2018
Haiti
2020 in Haitian sport
2021 in Haitian sport